Lieutenant Colonel Harry Arthur Smith SG, MC (born 25 July 1933) is a former senior officer in the Australian Army, seeing service during the Malayan Emergency and the Vietnam War. He was the Officer Commanding D Company, 6th Battalion, Royal Australian Regiment (D Coy, 6 RAR) during the Battle of Long Tan on 18 August 1966.

Early years
Smith was born in Hobart, Tasmania on 25 July 1933.

Military career
After service as a National Serviceman, Smith joined the Australian Regular Army and graduated as second lieutenant from the Officer Cadet School, Portsea. He was subsequently posted to the 2nd Battalion, Royal Australian Regiment in 1955 and later served during the Malayan Emergency between 1955 and 1957.

Battle of Long Tan
From 8 June 1966 to 14 June 1967, Smith, then a major, was Officer Commanding D Coy, 6 RAR. On 18 August, after heavy mortar shelling of the Australian base at Nui Dat the previous night, companies from 6 RAR were sent out to locate the Vietnamese units involved. Smith led the 105 soldiers of D Coy and the 3 man NZ Artillery Party out on patrol, but at 3:15pm, while patrolling a rubber plantation at Long Tan that afternoon, they encountered a reinforced regiment-sized Vietnamese force (the Viet Cong 275th Regiment, supported by the North Vietnamese Army 806 Battalion and D440 and D445 Battalions) attempting to advance on the base. A monsoon struck at the same time, but Smith organised his forces to successfully hold off the assault, while coordinating support from Australian, New Zealand, and United States artillery units back at Nui Dat. D Coy was reinforced at 6:55pm by a B Company Platoon then A Company in APCs, the Vietnamese having started to withdraw. 18 Australians were killed and 24 wounded during the Battle of Long Tan, but under Smith's command, D Coy had fended off a numerically superior force, with at least 245 Vietnamese confirmed as killed, and another 500 believed wounded. 800 enemy killed or died from wounds were listed in records found in 1969. 9 Delta Company men were given gallantry awards, but many of these had been downgraded from the original nomination: Smith's leadership of his men during the fierce fighting saw him recommended for the Distinguished Service Order, but he instead received the Military Cross. Smith is portrayed by Travis Fimmel in the 2019 film Danger Close: The Battle of Long Tan.

Post-war service
Following service in Vietnam, Smith commanded 1 Commando Company at Georges Heights and was later posted as the inaugural CO/CI of the Parachute Training School. Smith left the Army in 1976 after a parachuting injury.

Upgrading of award
On 14 August 2008, after years of campaigning for better recognition of Long Tan veterans, Smith's Military Cross was upgraded to the Star of Gallantry (the Australian honours system replacement for the Commonwealth Distinguished Service Order). On the same day, two others who fought at Long Tan had their bravery awards upgraded to correspond to the original nominations. On 9 March 2011 at the Maryborough Military and Colonial Museum, Smith was presented with the Star of Gallantry by local MP Paul Neville. Many of the Long Tan veterans were in attendance for the ceremony.

Honours and awards

Notes

References

Further reading

External links
Biography , battleoflongtan.reddunefilms.com

1933 births
Australian Army officers
Australian military personnel of the Malayan Emergency
Australian military personnel of the Vietnam War
Australian recipients of the Military Cross
Graduates of the Officer Cadet School, Portsea
Living people
People from Hobart
Recipients of the Gallantry Cross (Vietnam)
Recipients of the National Order of Vietnam
Recipients of the Star of Gallantry